Iblis, alternatively known as Eblīs, is the leader of the devils in Islam. According to the Quran, Iblis was thrown out of heaven, after he refused to prostrate himself before Adam. Regarding the origin and nature of Iblis, there are two different viewpoints.

In the first version, before Iblis was cast down from heaven, he used to be a high-ranking angel (Karub) called Azazil, appointed by God to obliterate the original disobedient inhabitants of the earth, who were replaced with humans, as more obedient creatures. In the alternative account, God created Iblis from the fires beneath the seventh earth. Worshipping God for thousands of years, Iblis ascended to the surface, whereupon, thanks to his pertinacious servitude, he rose until he reached the company of angels in the seventh heaven. When God created Adam and ordered the angels to bow down, Iblis, being a jinn created from fire, refused, and disobeyed God, leading to his downfall.

Some Sufi Muslims uphold a more ambivalent role for Iblis, considering him not simply the Devil but actually "the truest monotheist"  (because he would worship only the Creator, and  not his creations) while preserving the term  exclusively for evil forces.

Naming and etymology 
This is the major opinion among Arab scholars, who maintain the tradition that the personal name of this being was actually, not Iblīs, but Azazil: 

Some Muslim teachers, such as al-Jili, relate this name to talbis meaning confusion, because God's command confused him. 

Another possibility is that it is derived from Ancient Greek , via a Syriac intermediary, which is also the source of the English word 'devil'. Yet another possibility relates this name to the bene ha Elohim (sons of the Elohim), who had been identified with fallen angels in the early centuries, but had been singularized under the name of their leader.

However, there is no general agreement on the root of the term. The name itself could not be found before the Quran in Arab literature, but can be found in Kitab al Magall, a Christian apocryphal work written in Arabic.

In Islamic traditions, Iblīs is known by many alternative names or titles, such as Abū Murrah (Arabic: أَبُو مُرَّة, "Father of Bitterness") as the name stems from the word "murr" - meaning "bitter", ‘aduww Allāh or ‘aduwallah (Arabic: عُدُوّ الله, "enemy or foe" of God) and Abū Al-Harith (Arabic: أَبُو الْحَارِث, "the father of the plowmen"). He is also known by the nickname "Abū Kardūs" (Arabic: أَبُو كَرْدُوس), which may mean "Father who piles up, crams or crowds together".

Origin and classification 
Iblis may be a fallen angel or a jinni or a being of a nature entirely unique. This lack of final specification arises from the Quran itself, while Iblis is included into the command addressed to the angels and apparently among them, it is said he was from the jinn in Surah , whose exact meaning is debated by both Western academics and Islamic scholars. The motif of prostrating angels with one exception among them already appeared in early Christian writings and apocalyptic literature. For this reason, one might assume Iblis was intended to be an angel. Samael might be the midrashic counterpart of Iblis. Both, created from fire, oppose God's new creation out of envy. In objection to the Quran relating Iblis to the jinn, some scholars argue this to be unlikely to be the general opinion of the Quran. Paul Eichler argues that, especially when the Quran calls Iblis a jinni, his creation from fire is not mentioned, while when his creation from fire is mentioned, the connection between Iblis' fire and the fire of the jinn is absent. Whenever the Quran speaks about the creation of jinn, their fire is described with special attributes (like "smokeless"), whereas Iblis' fire is never described in such a manner throughout the Quran. In Ancient Near Eastern traditions, not only jinn, but also angels, such as a Seraph, have been associated with fire. Others proposed that jinni might have been a later interpolation, when both jinn and Iblis have been merged into the same category of evil spirits. Jacques Waardenburg argues, that Iblis' might have been considered an angel first, but appears to be a jinni in later Surahs. Whereas Satan has been known to be an angel in the Judeo-Christian tradition, Muhammad would have depicted Satan as a jinni, as a result of syncretism between monotheism and Arabian paganism, drawing a line between the angels on God's side and the jinn on the side of the pagans. The sharp distinction between angels and Iblis is supported by the later theological doctrine of angelic infallibility. While the angels possess no free will, it is necessary for Iblis to be an entity apart, and Iblis being a jinni explains his downfall. Otherwise, it has been argued that supernatural creatures in early Islamic tradition were not expected to commit or reject sin. Accordingly, Iblis could not be distinguished from angels by exercising free will in Islam's early stage, and Iblis would originally be depicted as created as a "rebellious angel".

Theology 
Theology (Kalām) discusses Iblis' role in the Quran and matters of free-will. Some, especially the Muʿtazila, emphasize free-will and that Iblis freely chose to disobey. Others assert that Iblis was predestined by God to disobey. By that, God shows his entire spectrum of attributes (for example; his wiliness) in the Quran, but also teaches humankind the consequences of sin and disobedience. Al-Damiri reports, most mufassir do not regard disobedience alone to be the reason for Iblis' punishment, but attributing injustice to God by objecting God's order. By that, responded God in God's attribute of Jalal (majesty). By that, Iblis distanced himself from God, since, by definition, Jalal cannot have (divine) intimicay.

According to most scholars, Iblis is a mere creature and thus cannot be the cause or creator of evil in the world; in his function as a devil, he is seen only as a tempter who takes advantage of humanity's weaknesses and self-centeredness and leads them away from God's path. Iblis and his fellow devils can only operate with God's permission. The existence of evil has been created by God himself. The idea that God and the devil are two opposing and independent principles, has been rejected by Muslim theologians, like Maturidi, as part of pre-Islamic Iranian beliefs.

Iblis also features as the progenitor of the devils, and thus referred to as the "father of the devils" (abū al-shayāṭīn).

Quran 

Iblis is mentioned 11 times in the Quran by name, nine times related to his refusal against God's command to prostrate himself before Adam. The term Shaytan is more prevalent, although Iblis is sometimes referred to as Shaytan; the terms are not interchangeable. The different fragments of Iblis's story are scattered across the Quran. In the aggregate, the story can be summarised as follows:

When God created Adam, He ordered the angels to bow before the new creation. All of the angels bowed down, but Iblis refused to do so. He argued that since he was created from fire, he is superior to humans, who were made from clay-mud, and that he should not prostrate himself before Adam. As punishment for his haughtiness, God banished Iblis from heaven and condemned him to hell. Later, Iblis requested the ability to try to mislead Adam and his descendants. God granted his request but also warned him that he would have no power over God's servants.

Affiliation  

There are different opinions regarding the proper meaning of "among the jinni" in the Quran. Apart from the Quranic narrative, Islamic exegesis offers two different accounts of Iblis's origin: according to one, he was a noble angel, to the other he was an ignoble jinn, who worked his way up to heaven. Some also consider him to be merely the ancestor of jinn, who was created in heaven, but fell due to his disobedience, as Adam slipped from paradise when he sinned. It might be this moment, Iblis turned into a jinn, but has been an angel created from fire before. 

According to exegetes of the Quran (tafsir), such as ibn Abbas, Tabari Ash'ari, Al-Tha`labi, Al-Baydawi and Mahmud al-Alusi Iblis was an angel in origin. Razi describes Iblis as "one of the closest angels" (muqarrabun). According to a tradition attributed to ibn Abbas and ibn Masud, in case of Iblis, the term jinn is used in reference to jannah (heaven). Accordingly, Iblis was a guardian and of a sub-category of "fiery angels". These angels, created from fire (nar), are to be distinguished by both the angels of mercy, created from light (nur), and the earthly jinn, created from "smokeless fire" (marijin min nar). Tabarsi argued that, if Iblis were a jinni, he couldn't become a custodian of paradise among the angels. Şaban Ali argues that identifying Iblis as a jinni is a mistranslation. He states, instead of "was one of the jinn", the proper translation would be, analogous to Surah 2:34, "became one of the jinn" and that Iblis has been an angel first, but became a jinn when he becomes an unbeliever. The transformation of Iblis from angelic into demonic is used, by advocates of Iblis' angelic origin, as reminder of God's capacity to reverse something even on an ontological level. It is both a warning and a reminder that the special gifts given by God can also be taken away by Him.Tabari goes further in his Quran commentary, and argues against objections made against Iblis' angelic origin:
"There is nothing objectionable in that God should have created the categories of His angels from all kinds of things that He had created: He created some of them from light, some of them from fire, and some of them from what He willed apart from that. There is thus nothing in God's omitting to state what He created His angels from, and in His stating what He created Iblis from, which necessarily implies that Iblis is outside of the meaning of [angel], for it is possible that He created a category of His angels, among whom was Iblis, from fire, and even that Iblis was unique in that He created him, and no other angels of His, from the fire of the Samum.

Likewise, he cannot be excluded from being an angel by fact that he had progeny or offspring, because passion and lust, from which the other angels were free, was compounded in him when God willed disobedience in him. As for God's statement that he was <one of the jinn>, it is not to be rejected that everything which hides itself (ijtanna) from the sight is a 'Jinn', as stated before, and Iblis and the angels should then be among them because they hide themselves from the eyes of the sons of Adam."

On the other hand, scholars arguing that the term jinni refers to jinn, and not a category of angels, don't need to explain Iblis' origin from fire, but they need to explain Iblis' stay among the angels. Examples of famous scholars who rejected Iblis' angelic origin are Hasan of Basra, Ibn Taimiyya, Ibn Kathir and Sayyid Qutb. This view is also attributed to the majority Mu'tazilah. They famously emphasize free will, and thus cannot argue that Iblis's has been predestined to fall, therefore his sin is necessary a result of rebellion against God's law, thus implying free will. This view was also popularized by Salafi scholars (such as Muhammad Al-Munajjid, who promulgated his view on IslamQA.info and Umar Sulaiman Al-Ashqar, in his famous Islamic Creed Series) in recent times.

There are two viewpoints regarding this matter. Hasan of Basra argues that Iblis has been the first of the jinn, and thus, like Adam, been created in paradise. However, when he sinned, he and his progeny were cast out. Ibn Kathir on the other hand, follows the narrative that jinn have lived before Adam on earth, but, unlike ibn Abbas, argues that Iblis was not of the angels battling the jinn, but a jinni himself. Accordingly, Iblis was once an ordinary jinni but, due to his piety and constant worship, elevated among the angels. He explains Iblis' jinnic origin as follows: 
"When Allah commanded the angels to prostrate before Adam, Iblis was included in this command. Although Iblis was not an angel, he was trying - and pretending - to imitate the angels' behavior and deeds, and this is why he was also included in the command to the angels to prostrate before Adam. Satan was criticized for defying that command, (. . .)

(So they prostrated themselves except Iblis. He was one of the Jinn;) meaning, his original nature betrayed him. He had been created from smokeless fire, whereas the angels had been created from light, (. . .)

When matters crucial every vessel leaks that which to contains and is betrayed by its true nature. Iblis used to do, what the angels did and resembled them in their devotion and worship, so he was included when they were addressed, but he disobeyed and went what he was told to do. So Allah points out here that he was one of the Jinn, he was created from fire, as He says elsewhere."

Many scholars also point out to the doctrine of angelic infallibility, arguing that Iblis could not have been an angel therefore. However, this view is contested and depends on exegetical decisions on Quranic verses, both about the nature of angels and the meaning of free will. While Hasan al Basri is known for exempting angels from all deficits, Abu Hanifa is reported as distinguishing between obedient angels, disobedient angels such as Harut and Marut, and unbelievers among the angels, like Iblis. For some, Iblis' disobedience is part of God's will. God would have created Iblis, differing from the other angels, from fire, installing a rebellious nature in him, so he will rebel and be endowed with the task to seduce humans, just as other angels are endowed with different tasks corresponding to their nature.

Fate of Iblis 
While the Quran sentences Iblis to hell, interpreters are undecided if Iblis is already in hell, or will be thrown into hell after the Judgement Day. Some sources describe him and his host of devils as the first who enter hell to dwell therein forever, while according to others, he is already in hell. Due to the devils' creation from fire, some authors suggest they do not burn in hell, but will suffer in from intense cold (Zamhareer), instead of fire. Alternatively, Iblis is killed before the Judgement Day. Among Shia Muslims, the idea prevails that the Mahdi will kill Iblis. In manuals about Islamic eschatology, when Iblis is the last one on earth, the angels of divine justice will seize and kill him.

Yet others argue, that Iblis does not act upon free-will, but as an instrument of God. When Iblis is cast down to hell, he were sent to Sijjin, and didn't ask God to spare him from punishment in hell, but requested a chance to redeem himself by proving that he is right and leading humans into sin. Accordingly God makes him a tempter for humanity as long as his punishment endures. Ibn Arabi writes in his Al-Futuhat al-Makkiyya that Iblis and the devils (here: evil jinn) will say after hell ceases to be on the last day, their deeds were prescribed by God and thus not to be blamed when they tempted someone to sin. His abode in hell could be a merely temporary place, lasting from his fall until the Judgement Day; and after his assignment as a tempter is over, he might return to God as one of the most cherished angels. His final salvation develops from the idea that Iblis is only an instrument of God's anger, not due to his meritorious personality. Attar compares Iblis's damnation and salvation to the situation of Benjamin, since both were accused to show people a greater meaning, but were finally not condemned.

Sufism 

Sufism developed another perspective on Iblis, integrating him into a greater cosmological scheme. Iblis often became, along with Muhammed, one of the two true monotheists and God's instrument for punishment and deception. Therefore, some Sufis hold, Iblis refused to bow to Adam because he was devoted to God alone and refused to bow to anyone else. Yet not all Sufis agree with Iblis' redemption.

By weakening the evil in the Satanic figure, dualism is also degraded, that corresponds with the later Sufi cosmology of unity of existence rejecting dualistic tendencies. The belief in dualism or that "evil" is caused by something else than God, even if only by one's own will, is regarded as shirk by some Sufis. For Iblis' preference to be damned to hell rather than prostrating himself before someone else other than the "Beloved" (here referring to God), Iblis also became an example for unrequited love.

As a true Monotheist 
Among some Sufis, a positive perspective of Iblis' refusal developed, arguing that Iblis was forced to decide between God's command (amr) and will (irāda). Accordingly, Iblis refused to bow to Adam because he was devoted to God alone and refused to bow to anyone else. Thus Iblis would have followed the true will of God, by disobeying his command. This belief is also known as "Satan's monotheism" (tawḥīd-i Iblīs).

A famous narration about an encounter between Moses and Iblis on the slopes of Sinai, told by Mansur al-Hallaj, Ruzbihan Baqli and Abū Ḥāmid Ghazzali, emphasizes the nobility of Iblis. Accordingly, Moses asks Iblis why he refused God's order. Iblis replied that the command was actually a test. Then Moses replied, obviously Iblis was punished by being turned from an angel to a devil. Iblis responds, his form is just temporary but his love towards God remains the same.

For Ahmad Ghazali, Iblis was the paragon of lovers in self sacrifice for refusing to bow down to Adam out of pure devotion to God. Ahmad Ghazali's student Sheikh Adi ibn Musafir was among the Sunni Muslim mystics who defended Iblis, asserted that evil was also God's creation, Sheikh Adi argued that if evil existed without the will of God then God would be powerless and a powerless being can't be God.

Keeper of Paradise 
Although in the Quran, Iblis appears only with his fall and intention to mislead God's creation, another role, as the gatekeeper of the divine essence, developed, probably based on the oral reports of the Sahaba. In some interpretations, Iblis is associated with light that misleads people. Hasan of Basra was quoted as saying: "If Iblis were to reveal his light to mankind, they would worship him as a god." Additionally, based on Iblis' role as keeper of heaven and ruler of earth, Ayn al-Quzat Hamadani stated, Iblis represents the "Dark light" that is the earthen world, standing in opposite to the Muhammadan Light that represents the heavens. As such, Iblis would be the treasurer and judge to differentiate between the sinners and the believers. Quzat Hamadani traces back his interpretation to Sahl al-Tustari and Shayban Ar-Ra'i who in return claim to derive their opinions from Khidr. Quzat Hamadani relates his interpretation of Iblis' light to the shahada: Accordingly, people whose service for God is just superficial, are trapped within the circle of la ilah (the first part of shahada meaning "there is no God") just worshipping their nafs (bodily urges) rather than God. Only those who are worthy to leave this circle can pass Iblis towards the circle of illa Allah, the "Divine presence".

Rejecting apologetics 
However, not all Sufis are in agreement with a positive depiction of Iblis. In Ibn Ghanim's retelling of the encounter between Iblis and Moses, Iblis does not truly offer an excuse for his disobedience. Instead, Iblis' arguments brought forth against Moses are nothing but a sham and subtly deception to make Sufis doubt the authenticity of their own spiritual path. Ruzbihan Baqli, too, seems to be critical of Iblis', asserting that his apologetics are mere inventions to claim innocence. In this context, al-Baqli calls Iblis the master of religious deception and father of lies.

In Rumi's Masnavi Book 2, Iblis wakes Mu'awiya up for prayer. Doubting any good intentions from Satan, Mu'awiya starts arguing with Iblis and asking him about his true intentions. Iblis uses several arguments to proof his own innocence: being a former archangel who would never truly abandon God; being merely a tempter who just brings forth the evil in the sinners, to distinguish them from true believers, but is not evil himself; God's omnipotence and that Iblis' sin ultimate results in God's judgement. Mu'awiya fails to stand against Iblis with reason and seeks refuge in God. Finally, Iblis confesses, he only woke him up, for missing a prayer and causing Mu'awiya to repent, would bring him closer to God than praying. Rumi rejects the idea of "Satan's monotheism" (tawḥīd-i Iblīs) asserted by many other Sufis, as his argument, that Iblis was an angel first, doesn't excuse him.

Rumi views Iblis as the manifestation of the great sins of haughtiness and envy. He states: "(Cunning) intelligence is from Iblis, and love from Adam." For Shah Waliullah Dehlawi, Iblis represents the principle of "one-eyed" intellect; he only saw the outward earthly form of Adam, but was blind to the Divine spark hidden in him, using an illicit method of comparison.

Hasan of Basra holds that Iblis was the first who used "analogy", comparing himself to someone else, this causing his sin. Therefore, Iblis also represents humans' psyche moving towards sin or shows how love can cause envy and anxiety.

In tradition

Story of Iblis 

Most stories regarding Iblis consider him to be involved in a battle between angels and jinn. However, versions differ on whether Iblis was one of the angels or of the jinn during the battle.

As a jinn, Iblis is supposed to have lived on earth before the creation of humans. When the angels arrived to battle the jinn, they took prisoners, among them Iblis, and were carried to heaven. Since he, unlike the other jinn, was pious, the angels were impressed by his nobility, and Iblis was allowed to join the company of angels and elevated to their rank. Although he got the outer appearance of an angel, he was still a jinn in essence, and thus able to disobey God later. He was then sentenced to hell forever, but  God granted him a favor for his former worship, that is to take revenge on humans by attempting to mislead them until the Day of Judgment.

Traditions considering Iblis being an angel, often describe him as an archangel (malak al-muqarrab),  called Azazil. According to this story, Azazil/Iblis was the leader and Imam (teacher) of the  angels, and became a guardian of heaven. At the same time, he was the closest to the Throne of God. God gave him authority over the lower heavens and the earth. When God sent the angels to earth to battle the jinn, Azazil/Iblis and his army drove the jinn to the edge of the world, Mount Qaf.

Knowing about the corruption of the former earthen inhabitants, Iblis protested, when he was instructed to prostrate himself before the new earthen inhabitant, that is Adam. He assumed that the angels who praise God's glory day and night are superior in contrast to the mud-made humans and their bodily flaws. He even regarded himself superior in comparison to the other angels, since he was (one of those) created from fire. However, he was degraded and sentenced to hell (Sijjin), by God for his arrogance.

Iblis is said to had four wings. After he was cursed, his form turned from that of an angel into a devil. God transformed his neck to that of a pig, and his head into that of a camel. His eyes are stretched all over his face, and canines the fangs of a boar. From his beard, only seven hairs grow.

After he was cast out from among the angels, God made him able to beget children. God aroused hatred within Iblis, so that a spark of fire emanated from him. From this spark of fire (samum), God created Iblis' wife. In other traditions, God made Iblis hermaphrodite, and Iblis begot offspring by himself alone.

Qisas al-Anbiya 
According to the Stories of the Prophets, to enter the abode of Adam in garden Eden, Iblis uses the biblical serpent to sneak in. The garden is watched by an angelic guardian. He invents a plan to trick him and approaches a peacock and tells him that all creatures are destined to die and thus the peacock's beauty will perish. But if he gets the fruit of eternity, he could make every creature immortal. Therefore, the peacock persuades the serpent to slip Iblis into the Garden, by carrying him in his mouth. In similar narration, Iblis is warded off by Riḍwan's burning sword for 100 years. Then he found the serpent. He says since he was one of the first cherub, he will one day return to God's grace and promises to show gratitude if the serpent does him a favor. In both narratives, in the Garden, Iblis speaks through the serpent to Adam and Eve, and tricks them into eating from the forbidden tree.

Modern Muslims accuse the Yazidis of devil-worship for venerating the peacock. The image of the biblical serpent might derive from Gnostic and Jewish oral tradition circulating in the Arabian Peninsula,

Iconography 

Iblis is perhaps one of the most well-known individual supernatural entities and was depicted in multiple visual representations like the Quran and Manuscripts of Bal‘ami’s ‘Tarjamah-i Tarikh-i Tabari. Iblis was a unique individual, described as both a pious jinn and at times an angel before he fell from God's grace when he refused to bow before the prophet Adam. After this incident, Iblis turned into a shaytan. In visual appearance, Iblis was depicted in On the Monstrous in the Islamic Visual Tradition by Francesca Leoni as a being with a human-like body with flaming eyes, a tail, claws, and large horns on a grossly disproportionate large head.

Illustrations of Iblis in Islamic paintings often depict him black-faced, a feature which would later symbolize any satanic figure or heretic, and with a black body, to symbolize his corrupted nature. Another common depiction of Iblis shows him wearing a special head covering, clearly different from the traditional Islamic turban. In one painting, however, Iblis wears a traditional Islamic head covering. The turban probably refers to a narration of Iblis' fall: there he wore a turban, then he was sent down from heaven. Many other pictures show and describe Iblis at the moment, when the angels prostrate themselves before Adam. Here, he is usually seen beyond the outcrop, his face transformed with his wings burned, to the envious countenance of a devil. Iblis and his cohorts (div or shayatin) are often portrayed in Turko-Persian art as bangled creatures with flaming eyes, only covered by a short skirt. Similar to European arts, who took traits of pagan deities to depict devils, they depicted such demons often in a similar fashion to that of Hindu-deities.

As a muse 
During the early Abbaside period, Iblis might have been an inspirational figure, some sort of musical patron, for anti-religious poets and hedonists, such as al-Walid. In Muslim culture, it is said some people had befriended Iblis as a muse. Hilal al-Kufi (end of the seventh century) was nicknamed "companion of Iblis" (sahib Iblis). Abu al-Fadl Muhammad al Tabasi frequently invokes Iblis (or Azazil) and his progeny in his Medieval encyclopedia of magic. Iblis is further said to approach dying people to tempt them away from Islam in exchange for their life. According to the Islamic Book of the Dead, Iblis in disguise approaches a thirsty man with a cup of water, but only handing him water over, if he testifies "two gods", "no one formed the universe" or "the Messenger, peace be upon him, lied".

In literature
In Vathek by the English novelist William Beckford, first composed in French (1782), the protagonists enter the underworld, presented as the domain of Iblis. At the end of their journey, they meet Iblis in person, who is described less in the monstrous image of Dante's Satan, but more of a young man, whose regular features are tarnished, his eyes showing both pride and despair and his hair resembling whose of an angel of light.

In Muhammad Iqbal's poetry, Iblis is critical about overstressed obedience, which caused his downfall. But Iblis is not happy about humanity's obedience towards himself either; rather he longs for humans who resist him, so he might eventually prostrate himself before the perfect human, which leads to his salvation.

Egyptian novelist Tawfiq al-Hakim's al-Shahid (1953) describes the necessity of Iblis's evil for the world, telling about a fictional story, Iblis seeking repentance. He consults the Pope and the chief Rabbi. Both reject him and he afterward visits the grand mufti of Al-Azhar Mosque, telling him he wants to embrace Islam. The grand mufti, however, rejects Iblis as well, realizing the necessity of Iblis' evilness. Regarding the absence of Iblis' evil, as causing most of the Quran to be obsolete. After that Iblis goes to heaven to ask Gabriel for intercession. Gabriel too rejects Iblis and explains the necessity for Iblis's curse. Otherwise, God's light could not be seen on earth. Whereupon Iblis descends from heaven shouting out: "I am a martyr!". Al-Hakim's story has been criticized as blasphemous by several Islamic scholars. Salafi scholar Abu Ishaq al-Heweny stated: "I swear by God it would never cross the mind, at all, that this absolute kufr reaches this level, and that it gets published as a novel".

See also

References 

Angels in Islam
Demons in Islam
Fallen angels
Individual angels
Jahannam
Jinn
Satan